"Pa Mis Muchachas" is a song recorded by American singers Christina Aguilera, Becky G and Argentine rapper and singer Nicki Nicole featuring Argentine singer Nathy Peluso for the former's ninth studio and second Spanish-language album Aguilera (2022). It was written by the performers alongside Kat Dahlia, Yasmil Marrufo, Jorge Luis Chacín, and Yoel Henriquez. Its production was handled by Rafa Arcaute and Federico Vindver, co-produced by Afo Verde, and vocal production handled by Jean Rodríguez. The song was released through Sony Music Latin as the album's lead single on October 22, 2021, marking Aguilera's return Spanish-language music after nine years.

Featured on the album's first part, La Fuerza, "Pa Mis Muchachas" follows La Fuerza's theme of celebrating womanhood and female empowerment. Musically, it is a guaracha song, and its lyrics focus on how a woman's strength is passed down through generations. The song was received positively by critics, being likened to Aguilera's 2001 rendition of "Lady Marmalade". It was a top 20 hit on record charts in Mexico, Chile, Puerto Rico, Ecuador, El Salvador, Peru and Venezuela, among other Latin American countries. "Pa Mis Muchachas" has received a platinum certification (Latin field) by the Recording Industry Association of America (RIAA) as well as three nominations at the 23rd Annual Latin Grammy Awards, including for Record and Song of the Year.

Background and composition 
"Pa Mis Muchachas" is Aguilera's first single in Spanish since her rendition of "Hoy Tengo Ganas de Ti" with Alejandro Fernández in 2013. Aguilera began work on her second Spanish-language album in 2015, and later relocated to Miami, Florida in early 2021 to record the record. Recording sessions were held at Art House studios, starting in February 2021. "Pa Mis Muchachas" was the first song written and recorded for the album, during the first session. After being introduced to Becky G, Nicole and Peluso, Aguilera decided that they were the perfect collaborators for the song.

"Pa Mis Muchachas" is a guaracha song, a genre of music characterized by fast tempo which originated from Cuba. It is written in the key of A minor with a moderately fast tempo of 118 beats-per-minute. Like the rest of La Fuerza, the song's lyrical content focuses on female empowerment, serving as "an homage to women", with Aguilera noting that. The song talks about how a woman's strength is "something that gets passed down by generations". It was chosen as the lead single because it embraces Aguilera's "love of feeling like a unit".

Release and promotion 
After teasing the single through several teaser videos on her social media, Aguilera eventually announced "Pa Mis Muchachas" and Becky G, Nicole and Peluso as her collaborators on October 19, 2021. The song and its music video were released on October 22, 2021. The song was performed for the first time at the 22nd Annual Latin Grammy Awards, alongside Becky G, Nicole and Peluso. The performance was called a "decadent, grrl-power-filled showcase" by The Latin Recording Academy. "Pa Mis Muchachas" was performed solo for the first time at World AIDS Day Concert LA Revival, held by the AIDS Healthcare Foundation on December 1, 2021. It was then featured on Aguilera's 2022 EU/UK Summer Series promotional tour. Aguilera performed the song again during her live-streamed show at the Hollywood Palladium organized in celebration of the 35 year partnership between Citi and American Airlines on October 6, 2022.

Critical reception 
Upon release, the song received positive reviews. Harper's Bazaar writer Bianca Betancourt noted that "Aguilera's signature vocals shine over the infectious guaracha-style beat — a high-tempo genre that stems from Cuba" adding that "it's the best she's sounded in years". A Manila Standard writer also praised Aguilera's vocals noting that the track contains "simmering acoustic guitar threads around a head-nodding beat as [Aguilera's] instantly recognizable vocals ring out". They went on to say that her "show-stopping delivery" complimented the accompanying voices of Becky G, Nicki Nicole, and Nathy Peluso and that the song "unites some of the boldest powerhouses in Latin music and culture, heating up each verse". Paige Mastrandrea of Ocean Drive praised the song for its "nostalgic vibe" that the audiences were "craving from" Aguilera since her previous female collaboration — 2001's "Lady Marmalade", a sentiment also shared by Enrique Cerros of NEIU Independent. Billboard considered the song "a modern-day girl-power anthem that honors the Latinas that came before us", and Rolling Stone Lucas Villa simply labelled it as "mighty". Writing for Atwood Magazine, Josh Weiner found the song "extraordinary", a "delight", and "one of the most energetic numbers Aguilera’s produced in recent memory". Pip Ellwood-Hughes from Entertainment Focus thought the song is "as infectious as it is powerful", and praised Aguilera for her work with Latin female artists, which he believed "works well for the purpose of this song". Cynthia Valdez of ¡Hola! opined that "Pa Mis Muchachas" "overflows with spirit, strength, soul and style", and noted that the performers "make each verse of the song explode with emotion". AllMusic's Neil Z. Yeung named the song a "showstopper" which "ends with a shiver-inducing vocal run that could bring the house down".

"Pa Mis Muchachas" was listed as one of the best Latin songs of 2021 by Amazon Music's experts. It was ranked at number thirty-nine on the top hundred list. Bianca Betancourt of Harper's Bazaar placed the song at number nineteen on the list of 2021's best songs, and called it "a bold and vivacious anthem celebrating the female friendships that make us stronger, in which Aguilera belts her signature runs over a traditional Cuban guaracha beat." She added that Aguilera "remains one of the strongest vocalists of her generation — regardless of language". The Tab Harrison Brocklehurst named "Pa Mis Muchachas" "one of the greatest songs of 2021" and "one of the best songs of her [Aguilera's] career".

Commercial performance 
"Pa Mis Muchachas" debuted and peaked at number 3 on the Billboard Latin Digital Song Sales on the chart issue dated November 6, 2021. It also debuted within Top 20 of another Billboard chart, namely Hot Trending Songs. It charted at number 18 on the Latin Pop Airplay, and number 37 on the Hot Latin Songs. The song received a platinum certification (Latin field) from the Recording Industry Association of America (RIAA) and reached the top tens of various Latin music markets.

Music video

Background 
Aguilera first teased the video with a 15-second snippet of two women walking into a party against a backdrop of guitar string sounds, before fading out. The clip gained more than 528,000 views on Twitter. Aguilera noted that the video is a "first episode of a long story to come ... This is a celebration of individuality. This is a story about strength, about how to let your hair down. About rediscovering yourself along the way".

Release 
The music video was released alongside the song on October 22. It was directed by Alexandre Moors. The singer portrays a mafia boss of the underground association where women "look out for each other". Aguilera's character gets betrayed by a love interest (played by Francesco Cuizza) and it is decided he needs to be captured and eliminated.

On October 29, 2021, MTV Music UK included the video on its playlist of "the biggest music videos" of the week. In November 2021, the video was included in the MTV Latin America's list of top twenty music videos. In December, Radio Disney Latino named "Pa Mis Muchachas" the 2nd best music video of 2021.

Accolades

Charts

Weekly charts

Year-end charts

Certifications

Release history

References

2021 singles
2021 songs
Christina Aguilera songs
Becky G songs
Nicki Nicole songs
Nathy Peluso songs
Songs written by Christina Aguilera
Songs written by Becky G
Spanish-language songs
Songs with feminist themes
Sony Music Latin singles
Songs written by Nicki Nicole
Songs written by Nathy Peluso